The Belarusian Latin alphabet or Łacinka (from  or łacinka, BGN/PCGN: Latsinka) for the Latin script in general is the common name for writing Belarusian using Latin script. It is similar to the Sorbian alphabet and incorporates features of the Polish and Czech alphabets. Today, Belarusian most commonly uses the Cyrillic alphabet.

Use
Łacinka was used in the Belarusian area from the 16th century until the 1930s. During the time of the Nazi German-occupied Belarusian territories, the Łacinka script was used as the only official script for the Belarusian language.

It is used occasionally in its current form by certain authors, groups and promoters in the Naša Niva weekly, the ARCHE journal, and some of the Belarusian diaspora press on the Internet.

The system of romanisation in the Łacinka is phonological rather than orthographical, and thus certain orthographic conventions must be known. For instance, the Łacinka equivalent to Cyrillic  can be e, ie or je, depending on its position in a word. Also, there is no soft sign in Łacinka; palatalisation is instead represented by a diacritic on the preceding consonant.

The official Belarusian romanisation 2007 system is similar to Łacinka but transliterates Cyrillic л in different ways: л = ł (Łacinka) = l (official), ль = l (Łacinka) = ĺ (official), ля = la (Łacinka) = lia (official).

History

In the 16th century, the first known Latin renderings of Belarusian Cyrillic text occurred, in quotes of Ruthenian in Polish and Latin texts. The renderings were not standardised, and Polish orthography seems to have been used for Old Belarusian sounds.

In the 17th century, Belarusian Catholics gradually increased their use of the Latin script but still largely in parallel with the Cyrillic. Before the 17th century, the Belarusian Catholics had often used the Cyrillic script.

In the 18th century, the Latin script was used, in parallel with Cyrillic, in some literary works, like in drama for contemporary Belarusian.

In the 19th century, some Polish and Belarusian writers of Polish cultural background sometimes or always used the Latin script in their works in Belarusian, notably Jan Czeczot, Paŭluk Bahrym, Vincent Dunin-Marcinkievič, Francišak Bahuševič, and Adam Hurynovič. The Revolutionary Democrat Konstanty Kalinowski used only the Latin script in his newspaper Peasants’ Truth (in Latin script: Mużyckaja prauda; six issues in 1862–1863).

Such introduction of the Latin script for the language broke with the long Cyrillic tradition and is sometimes explained by the unfamiliarity of the 19th century writers with the history of the language or with the language itself or by the impossibility of acquiring or using the Cyrillic type at the printers that the writers had been using.

The custom of using the Latin script for Belarusian text gradually ceased to be common, but at the beginning of the 20th century, there were still several examples of use of the Latin script in Belarusian printing:

Newspaper Nasha Dolya (1906).
Newspaper Nasha Niva (the issues during 10.11.1906 – 31.10.1912) — issues in both Cyrillic and Latin (with the subheading: Printed weekly in Russian and in Polish letters (in Latin script: Wychodzić szto tydzień ruskimi i polskimi literami)).
Tsyotka’s Belarusian Violin (Skrypka biełaruskaja), Baptism to Freedom (Chrest na swabodu) — books of poetry.
Tsyotka’s First reading for Belarusian children (Perszaje czytannie dla dzietak-biełarusaŭ) — an attempt at creating a Belarusian elementary reading book.
Yanka Kupala’s Zither Player (Huslar; 1910) — book of poetry.
 rev. Baliaslau Pachopka’s Belarusian Grammar (1915, publ. in 1918) — Belarusian grammar, based entirely on Latin script, but is claimed by Belarusian linguists, however, to be prepared unscientifically and breaking the traditions of the Belarusian language. See also Belarusian grammar.

In the 1920s in the Belarusian SSR, like the Belarusian Academic Conference (1926), some suggestions were made to consider a transition of the Belarusian grammar to the Latin script (for example, Zmicier Zhylunovich for "making the Belarusian grammar more progressive"). However, they were rejected by the Belarusian linguists (such as Vaclau Lastouski).

From the 1920s to 1939, after the partition of Belarus (1921), the use of a modified Latin script was reintroduced to Belarusian printing in Western Belarus, chiefly for political reasons. The proposed form of the Belarusian Latin alphabet and some grammar rules were introduced for the first time in the 5th (unofficial) edition of Tarashkyevich's grammar (Vil'nya, 1929).

Belarusian was written in the Latin script in 1941 to 1944 in the German-occupied Belarusian territories and by the Belarusian diaspora in Prague (1920s – c.1945).

After the Second World War, Belarusian was occasionally written in the Latin script by the Belarusian diaspora in Western Europe and the Americas (notably in West Germany and the United States). In 1962, Yan Stankyevich proposed a completely new Belarusian Latin alphabet.

Today

Nowadays, Łacinka is used rarely apart from some posters and badges. Yet, some books continue to be published in this script. For instance:
 Uładzimir Arłoŭ. 2015. Patria Aeterna. Apaviadańni [Patria Aeterna: Short Stories]. Minsk: A. N. Varaksin. 
 Ryčard Havialis. 2018. Vilenski pokier [Vilnius Poker] (translated from the Lithuanian by Paŭlina Vituščanka). Vilnius: Logvino literatūros namai and Minsk: Lohvinaŭ. . NB: The paper book was published in Cyrillic in Taraškievica. Yet, the ebook is available in three orthographically and scriptaly different versions, namely, also in Łacinka and official orthography, apart from the faithful copy of the paper edition.
 Alhierd Bacharevič. 2022. Vieršy Вершы  [Poems]. Prague: Vydaviectva Viasna Выдавецтва Вясна., 142pp. NB: Each poem is given in Łacinka and Cyrillic.
 In Vilnius since 1997 functions a magazine Рунь (Ruń, ISNN 1392-7671), recent issues of which include  articles in both Cyrillic Taraškievica and Łacinka.

In late 2021 a project of the Latin alphabet-based Belarusian Wikipedia, that is, the Biełaruskaja Wikipedyja łacinkaj, commenced. The project is backed by the democratically-elect President of Belarus Sviatlana Tsikhanouskaya and her team.

On the occasion of the International Mother Language Day (February 21) in 2023, a machine-converted website edition of Naša Niva in Łacinka was launched.

See also
 Romanization of Belarusian
 Instruction on transliteration of Belarusian geographical names with letters of Latin script
 Russian Latin alphabet
 Ukrainian Latin alphabet

References 

Ad. Stankiewič. Biełaruskaja mowa ŭ škołach Biełarusi – Wilnia : Wydawiectwa „Biełaruskaje krynicy“. Bieł. Druk. Im. Fr. Skaryny ŭ Wilni Ludwisarskaja 1, 1928; Менск : Беларускае коопэрацыйна-выдавецкае таварыства ″Адраджэньне″, 1993 [факсімільн.]
Б. Тарашкевіч. Беларуская граматыка для школ. – Вільня : Беларуская друкарня ім. Фр. Скарыны, 1929; Мн. : «Народная асвета», 1991 [факсімільн.]. – Выданьне пятае пераробленае і пашыранае.
Да рэформы беларускай азбукі. // Працы акадэмічнае канферэнцыі па рэформе беларускага правапісу і азбукі. – Мн. : [б. м.], 1927.
Дунін-Марцінкевіч В. Творы / [Уклад., прадм. і камент. Я. Янушкевіча]. – Мн. : Маст. літ., 1984.
К. Калиновский: Из печатного и рукописного наследия/Ин-т истории партии при ЦК КП Белоруссии – фил. Ин-та марксизма-ленинизма при ЦК КПСС. – Мн.: Беларусь, 1988. 
Сцяпан Некрашэвіч. Садаклад па рэформе беларускага правапісу на акадэмічнай канферэнцыі 1926 г. // Выбраныя навуковыя працы акадэміка С. Н. Некрашэвіча: Да 120-годдзя з дня нараджэння / НАН Беларусі; Ін-т мовазнаўства імя Я. Коласа; Навук. рэд. А. І. Падлужны. – Мн. : 2004. 
Як правільна гаварыць і пісаць пабеларуску. Беларускія корэспондэнцыйныя курсы ў Празе. – Прага : Dr. Jan Ermačenko, Běloruské vydavatelství, 1941; Менск : Беларускае коопэрацыйна-выдавецкае таварыства ″Адраджэньне″, 1992 [факсімільн.]. –  Міжнародная асацыяцыя беларусістаў, 1992. – Беларускае таварыства архівістаў, 1992.
Ян Станкевіч. Б. Тарашкевіч: Беларуская граматыка для школ. Выданьне пятае пераробленае і пашыранае. Вільня. 1929 г., бал. 132 + IV [1930–1931] // Ян Станкевіч. Збор твораў у двух тамах. Т. 1. – Мн.: Энцыклапедыкс, 2002. 
Ян Станкевіч. Беларуская Акадэмічная Конфэрэнцыя 14.—21.XI.1926 і яе працы дзеля рэформы беларускае абэцэды й правапісу (агульны агляд) [1927] // Ян Станкевіч. Збор твораў у двух тамах. Т. 1. – Мн.: Энцыклапедыкс, 2002. 
Ян Станкевіч. Як правільна гаварыць і пісаць пабеларуску (Пастановы Зборкаў Чысьціні Беларускае Мовы) [Вільня, 1937] // Ян Станкевіч. Збор твораў у двух тамах. Т. 1. – Мн.: Энцыклапедыкс, 2002. 
Ян Станкевіч. Які мае быць парадак літараў беларускае абэцады [1962] // Ян Станкевіч. Збор твораў у двух тамах. Т. 2. – Мн.: Энцыклапедыкс, 2002.

External links 

 Essay on "Łacinka"
 English-language introduction to a web site previously dedicated to "Łacinka" and totally written in "Łacinka"
 Online romanizer for Belarusian texts and websites

Belarusian
Latin alphabet
Proposals